Stipe Krnčević (12 December 1910 – 8 October 1978) was a Croatian rower. He competed at the 1936 Summer Olympics and the 1948 Summer Olympics.

References

1910 births
1978 deaths
Croatian male rowers
Olympic rowers of Yugoslavia
Rowers at the 1936 Summer Olympics
Rowers at the 1948 Summer Olympics
Sportspeople from Šibenik